The Golescu Bridge crosses the lower Someș River to the western part of Satu Mare city, linking the residential districts of Horea and Centru Nou. It is named after Nicolae Golescu, a Wallachian Romanian politician who served as the Prime Minister of Romania in 1860 and May–November 1868.

See also
 List of bridges in Romania

References

Arch bridges
Bridges in Romania
Bridges in Satu Mare